The ecoDemonstrator Program is a Boeing flight test research program, which has used a series of specially modified aircraft to develop and test aviation technologies designed to improve fuel economy and reduce the noise and ecological footprint of airliners.

Starting in 2012, several aircraft have tested 230 technologies as of 2022: many remain in further development but some are being implemented such as iPad apps for pilot real-time information to reduce fuel use and emissions; custom approach paths to reduce community noise; and cameras for ground navigation and collision avoidance.

History

Quiet Technology Demonstrator program
The ecoDemonstrator program followed the joint Rolls-Royce and Boeing Quiet Technology Demonstrator (QTD) program, which ran in 2001 and 2005 to develop a quieter engine using chevrons on the rear of the nacelle and exhaust nozzles, as well as an acoustically enhanced inlet liner. In 2001 an American Airlines Boeing 777-200ER with Rolls-Royce Trent 800 engines was used for the flight tests. Much testing was carried out at Glasgow Industrial Airport, Montana, the airport of Boeing's subsidiary, Montana Aviation Research Company (MARCO). The tests were successful, demonstrating better noise reduction than predicted and leading to redesign of wing leading edge de-icing holes to eliminate whistling, a modification which was immediately applied on the 777 production line. Once the QTD2 program began, this program started to be referred to as QTD1.

The resulting design changes were demonstrated in the 2005 Quiet Technology Demonstrator Two (QTD2) program in which a new Boeing 777-300ER, fitted with General Electric GE90-115B engines, was used for a three-week trial, again mainly at Boeing’s flight test centre at Glasgow Industrial Airport. As well as the modifications, the aircraft was equipped with extensive sound measurement equipment, and microphone arrays were laid out around the airfield. The chevrons have since been adopted on the Boeing 737 MAX series, 747-8 and 787 Dreamliner aircraft. 
Also tested on the QTD2 were streamlined toboggan fairings on the main landing gear to reduce noise.

In 2018 a new design of engine inlet liner was flight tested in a successor program, Quiet Technology Demonstrator 3 (QTD3), using acoustic arrays at Moses Lake, Washington. The NASA-designed inlet was installed in the right-hand nacelle of one of Boeing's two 737 MAX 7 prototypes, powered by CFM International LEAP 1B engines. The testing took place between 27 July and 6 August.

QTD aircraft summary

ecoDemonstrator program

The ecoDemonstrator program was formally launched in 2011, in partnership with American Airlines and the FAA. The first ecoDemonstrator aircraft, a Boeing 737-800, operated during 2012. Since then a different aircraft has been used each year, excepting 2013 and 2017, with testing operations lasting from a few weeks to over six months. The testing is usually done in collaboration with many industry partners, including NASA, the FAA, airlines, makers of engines, equipment and software, and academic institutions. The results of the tests are rarely publicised, respecting the confidentiality of the industrial partners. Up to 2022, of the roughly 230 technologies tested, about a third have been progressed on to Boeing's products and services.

In 2022, the ninth aircraft in the program, a Boeing 777-200ER wore a special 10th anniversary livery.

Participating aircraft

2012: Boeing 737-800

This was a new aircraft destined for American Airlines and in their livery. With this, the first ecoDemonstrator,  Boeing tested laminar flow technology for winglets, improving fuel efficiency by 1.8 percent. This fed directly into the design of the winglets used on the subsequent 737 MAX series. The aircraft tested other technologies, including:

 variable area fan nozzle to optimize engine efficiency
 regenerative hydrogen fuel cell for aircraft electrical power
adaptive outer wing trailing edges for greater take-off lift and decreased drag in cruise
 active engine vibration control
 flightpath optimization for operational efficiency
 carpet made from recycled materials
 sustainable aviation fuel (SAF).

2014: Boeing 787-8

The fourth production 787, a Boeing test airframe, was employed as the second ecoDemonstrator. It conducted 35 projects including:

 use of a 15% blend of SAF by both engines for nine flights
 acoustic ceramic matrix composite nozzle for weight and noise reduction
 aerodynamic and flight control improvements. 
 advanced wing coatings to reduce ice accumulation. 
 software applications and connectivity technologies that can improve flight planning, fuel-load optimization, in-flight routing, and landing. 
 touchscreen displays on the flight deck. 
 wireless sensors to reduce wiring, reduce weight and save fuel. 
 outer wing access doors made from recycled 787 carbon fibre.
 development of the Airborne Spacing for Terminal Arrival Routes (ASTAR) system to reduce spacing between aircraft on approach to airports.

2015: Boeing 757-200

This aircraft served with United Airlines for 23 years before being used by Boeing for the ecoDemonstrator program. The aircraft was painted in the TUI Group livery as a mark of their collaboration in the project, particularly in the environmental efficiency aspects. NASA's Langley Research Center was also a major participant as part of its Environmentally Responsible Aviation (ERA) project. At the end of the testing period the aircraft was, in conjunction with the Aircraft Fleet Recycling Association and the aircraft lessor Stifel, disassembled for recycling. Around 90% of materials were reused or recycled.

Technologies explored included:
 improvement of airflow with insect shields and anti-bug coatings on one wing
 active flow control over the vertical tail with the aim of increasing efficiency and reducing its size
 green diesel fuel testing.

2016: Embraer E170

The third E170 prototype first flew in 2002 and was retained by Embraer as a test and demonstration aircraft. It was the only non-Boeing aircraft so far to participate as an ecoDemonstrator. Testing projects included:

 use of LIDAR to complement existing air data sensors
 ice-phobic paint to reduce icing and insect debris buildup
 new noise-reducing flaps
 special sensors to investigate airflow and improve aerodynamics
 use of 10% Brazil-produced bio-fuel and 90% standard kerosene.

2018: Boeing 777F

FedEx supplied a newly-delivered 777 freighter for use in the ecoDemonstrator program. After two months of conversion, it was used in the testing program for around three months before restoration to its freighter role. Technologies explored included:

 smaller, lighter weight thrust reverser
 Safran electrical power distribution system
 use of 100% biofuel – the first commercial airliner to be entirely powered by SAF
 3D printed titanium tail fin cap using waste material and reducing the weight
 synthetic ILS using GPS giving increased reliability and potentially allowing reduced separation of aircraft on approach
 wake riding, involving flying closely behind another aircraft to give a fuel efficiency increase of up to 10%
 LIDAR clear-air turbulence detector
 SOCAS – Surface Operations and Collision Avoidance System, merging radar and video images for obstacle detection
 FLYHT Aerospace Solutions’ Automated Flight Information Reporting System (AFIRS) for tracking, distress and data-streaming from flight data recorders.

2019: Boeing 777-200

This airliner had served Air China since 2001 before Boeing purchased it to join the ecoDemonstrator program. During testing, the aircraft visited Frankfurt, Germany, as several experiments were sponsored by German organisations including the German Aerospace Center (DLR), Diehl Aerospace, and Fraport. Among the 50 projects trialled were:

 recyclable cabin carpet tiles
 moisture-absorbent toilet floor made from recycled carbon fibre
 chromate-free primer for aluminium parts to reduce manufacturing health risks
 sharing digital information between air traffic control (ATC), the flight deck and an airline's operations center to optimize routing efficiency and safety
 a connected electronic flight bag application to provide re-routing information
 connected galleys, lavatories, and cabin temperature and humidity sensors
 cameras for an outside view for passengers.

2020: Boeing 787-10

This new aircraft for Etihad Airways was used for just a few weeks between August and October 2020, with testing mainly carried out at Boeing's Glasgow Industrial Airport, Montana. The program included:

 noise measurement with over 1400 sensors for internal and external measurements
 noise reduction including Safran undercarriage modifications
 SAF testing with blends of 30% to 50%
 sanitisation methods for the COVID-19 pandemic.
 digital text-based ATC routing communications.

2021: Boeing 737 MAX 9

This 5-month program was conducted with a new airframe originally destined for Corendon Dutch Airlines but was painted in a special Alaska Airlines livery with ecoDemonstrator stickers. In October 2021 the aircraft flew from Seattle to Glasgow, Scotland, for the United Nations COP26 Climate Change Conference, bringing executives from Boeing and Alaska Airlines and fuelled by a 50% SAF fuel blend. The testing program included:

 low profile anti-collision light for weight and drag reduction and increased visibility
 text-based ATC communications
 halon-free fire extinguishing (ground testing only)
 noise reduction engine nacelles
 cabin walls made from recycled material
 50% SAF blend
 atmospheric greenhouse gas measurement system integration for airliners
 passenger air vent designs to create an air curtain between seat rows.

2022: Boeing 777-200ER

The aircraft was originally delivered to Singapore Airlines in 2002, and flew most recently for Surinam Airways. It wears a livery celebrating the 10th anniversary of the ecoDemonstrator program.  Boeing implies that this aircraft will operate as the ecoDemonstrator test aircraft until 2024. The company states that the six-month 2022 program will demonstrate 30 new technologies, among which are:

 the use of a 30% SAF blend
 disinfection of water from sinks for reuse in toilet flushing
 weight reduction through 3D printed parts
 noise reduction techniques 
 vortex generators which retract during cruise
 head-worn head-up display enhanced vision system
 fire-fighting system that does not use Halon
 environmentally-friendly galley cooler refrigerant.

ecoDemonstrator aircraft summary
Most information from Planespotters.net

All aircraft apart from the 2022 777 had ecoDemonstrator stickers applied to the fuselage or engine nacelles, at least one retaining them for some time after its participation in the program ended.

See also
Environmental impact of aviation

References

External links
Boeing: Environment
Boeing: ecoDemonstrator

Aircraft noise reduction
Boeing
Green vehicles
Aviation and the environment
2010s United States experimental aircraft
Research projects
Research and development in the United States
Aerodynamics
2011 establishments
Noise control